The Doolins of Oklahoma is a 1949 American Western film directed by Gordon Douglas and starring Randolph Scott, George Macready and Louise Allbritton. It was distributed by Columbia Pictures.

Plot
When the Daltons are killed at Coffeyville, KS, gang member Bill Doolin, arriving late, escapes but kills a man. Now wanted for murder, he becomes the leader of the Doolin gang. He eventually leaves the gang, marries and tries to start a new life under a new name. But the old gang members appear and his true identity becomes known. So once again he becomes an outlaw trying to escape from the law. Written by Maurice VanAuken

Cast
 Randolph Scott as Bill Doolin / Bill Daley
 George Macready as Marshal Sam Hughes
 Louise Allbritton as Rose of Cimarron
 John Ireland as Bitter Creek
 Virginia Huston as Elaine Burton
 Charles Kemper as Thomas "Arkansas" Jones
 Noah Beery Jr. as Little Bill
 Dona Drake as Cattle Annie
 Robert Barrat as Marshal Heck Thomas
 Lee Patrick as Melissa Price
 Griff Barnett as Deacon Burton
 Frank Fenton as Red Buck
 Jock Mahoney as Tulsa Jack Blake (as Jock O'Mahoney)

Reception
In his 2007 review, Dennis Schwartz gave the movie a grade of B, describing it as "a familiar Western formulaic set-up of a good man caught by circumstances and trapped in a life of crime" and stating "The old-fashioned story leaves a lot to be desired, but the cast takes it seriously and makes the unbelievable look as believable as possible."

References

External links

American black-and-white films
American Western (genre) films
Films directed by Gordon Douglas
1949 Western (genre) films
1949 films
Films scored by George Duning
Films scored by Paul Sawtell
1940s American films
1940s English-language films
Columbia Pictures films